Tortricopsis euryphanella is a moth of the family Oecophoridae. It is found in Australia, including Tasmania.

Oecophoridae